Peter Zuzin (born 4 September 1990) is a Slovak professional ice hockey player for HKM Zvolen of the Slovak Extraliga.

Career
Zuzin began his career with his local team HKM Zvolen of the Slovak Extraliga, making his pro debut for the team during the 2010–11 season. In 2014, Zuzin moved to HC Olomouc of the Czech Extraliga.

Career statistics

Regular season and playoffs

International

Awards and honors

References

External links

 

1990 births
Living people
SK Horácká Slavia Třebíč players
HC Olomouc players
Sportspeople from Zvolen
Slovak ice hockey forwards
Sokol Krasnoyarsk players
HC 07 Detva players
HKM Zvolen players
Ice hockey players at the 2022 Winter Olympics
Olympic ice hockey players of Slovakia
Medalists at the 2022 Winter Olympics
Olympic bronze medalists for Slovakia
Olympic medalists in ice hockey
Slovak expatriate ice hockey players in Russia
Slovak expatriate ice hockey players in the Czech Republic